The Society of Management Accountants of Canada, also known as Certified Management Accountants of Canada and CMA Canada, awards the Certified Management Accountant designation in Canada.

Activities
Until September 2015, CMA Canada, through its provincial and territorial affiliates, granted the CMA professional designation in accounting and was responsible for standards-setting, accreditation and the continuing professional development of CMAs.

CMAs applied expertise in accounting, management and strategy to ensure corporate accountability and help organizations maintain a long-term competitive advantage. In that regard, CMA Canada offered executive development programs, online courses, and knowledge management publications.

Management Accounting Guidelines and Management Accounting Practices were published by CMA Canada to specify the best practice on key topics in management accounting. They were available for download free of charge or on CD for a nominal charge to CMAs, and could be purchased by non-members. CPA Canada has taken over the programme, and has issued update guidance for many such matters under its own name, although none of the documents appear to acknowledge their SMAC origins.

From 1953 to 2015, the Society operated a foundation that was dedicated to furthering research in the field of management accounting.

History of the Society

The mission of the Society has closely tracked the evolution from cost accounting to management accounting in Canada, and its distinction from financial accounting:

 1920 - Incorporation of The Canadian Society of Cost Accountants, with head office in Hamilton, Ontario
 1926 - Introduction of Cost and Management, the predecessor of CMA Magazine
 1930 - Name changed to The Canadian Society of Cost Accountants and Industrial Engineers
 1941 - Formation of provincial societies in Ontario and Quebec, with the power to grant the newly established professional designation of Registered Industrial Accountant ("RIA")
 1948 - Name changed to Society of Industrial and Cost Accountants of Canada
 1968 - Name changed to The Society of Industrial Accountants of Canada
 1977 - Name changed to The Society of Management Accountants of Canada
 1985 - Introduction of the professional designation of Certified Management Accountant ("CMA"), with existing RIAs being grandfathered in
 2004 - CMA is registered as a trademark by CMA Canada
 2006 - Certified Management Accountant is registered as a trademark by CMA Canada
 2007 - Incorporation of the CMA Canada Research Foundation
 2009 - Introduction of The National Standard for Public Accounting for Certified Management Accountants to govern the affairs of CMAs that have entered into public practice
 2014 - Unification of the profession within CPA Canada, with legislative implementation substantially complete as of May 2017.

Timeline

Competencies, accreditation process and post-qualification development

CMAs are expected to undergo specific training and practical experience to achieve specified competencies in the area of strategic management accounting, which are intended to prepare them for senior leadership roles in their organizations. There are six functional competencies and four enabling competencies in that regard:

Functional competencies

 Strategic management
 Risk management and governance
 Performance management
 Performance measurement
 Financial management
 Financial reporting

Enabling competencies

 Problem solving and decision making
 Leadership and group dynamics
 Professionalism and ethical behaviour
 Communication

While candidates may come from a variety of backgrounds, the CMA career path is expected to progress in the following manner:

CMA candidates (without advanced professional standing) must have obtained a university degree and have credits in a specified list of subjects, before they can write the CMA Entrance Examination. Upon passing this stage, they then enter the Strategic Leadership Programme ("SLP"), which has the following components:

 Development Phase
 followed by the successful passing of the CMA Case Examination
 Application Phase
 leading to the successful preparation and presentation of the Board Report, containing detailed analysis and recommendations on a specified case study
 Completion of 24 months of relevant full-time progressive practical experience confirmed by the employer - of which at least 12 months must be concurrent with the SLP
 Candidates are expected to be expanding their on-the-job responsibilities while undertaking the SLP

Successful passage of the above will result in the granting of the CMA designation. After attaining the designation, there are specified requirements for continuous professional learning and development that must be undertaken to remain in good standing.

Notable members

 Navdeep Bains
 Peter G. Christie
 Roy Megarry
 Frederick John Mitchell
 Harinder Takhar
 J. Grant Thiessen
 Rick Thorpe

See also
 Canadian accounting profession

Notes

References

Further reading
 
 

Canadian accounting associations
Management accounting
Organizations established in 1920
1920 establishments in Canada
Member bodies of the International Federation of Accountants